Ronald Murray (born 1979) is an American basketball player.

Ronald or Ron Murray may also refer to:

Ron Murray (cricketer) (1927–1951), New Zealand cricketer
Ron Murray (born 1939), Australian rules footballer
Ronald King Murray, Lord Murray (1922–2016), Scottish Labour Party politician and judge
Ronald Murray (rugby union), Scottish rugby union player from the 1930s